Paradise is an unincorporated community in Whitefish Township, Chippewa County in the U.S. state of Michigan.

Its zip code is 49768, and the area code is (906)
Founded in 1925, Paradise is surrounded by state and national forests and its main business is tourism. It is considered one of two gateways to the Tahquamenon Falls area and Tahquamenon Falls State Park. The area draws hunters, fishers, campers, backpackers, snowmobilers and birdwatchers. The region harvests blueberries and cranberries in season. It is also the home of the  blueberry festival held every summer. Lake Superior shipping lanes are several miles off shore. The Paradise post office opened May 1, 1947.

Paradise is the main point of entry to Whitefish Point,  to the north, which is a world migratory route protected by the Seney National Wildlife Refuge, and studied by the Whitefish Point Bird Observatory.  It is also known for the Great Lakes Shipwreck Museum, its Lake Superior shoreline, the Whitefish Point Lighthouse, and the Whitefish Point Underwater Preserve, a series of sunken shipwrecks.
 
The Sufjan Stevens album Greetings from Michigan contains a song entitled "For The Widows In Paradise, For the Fatherless in Ypsilanti."

The Alex McKnight series of fictional crime books by author Steve Hamilton is set in Paradise, and includes numerous descriptions of the terrain and natural landmarks.

References

External links

Paradise Chamber of Commerce
Exploring Paradise
A Paradise Website

Unincorporated communities in Chippewa County, Michigan
Populated places established in 1925
1925 establishments in Michigan
Unincorporated communities in Michigan
Michigan populated places on Lake Superior